Somatidia is a genus of longhorn beetles of the subfamily Lamiinae, containing the following species:

Species
subgenus Araneosoma
 Somatidia aranea Olliff, 1889

subgenus Dentosoma
 Somatidia fulvipes Broun, 1923
 Somatidia lineifera Broun, 1909
 Somatidia spinicollis Broun, 1893

subgenus Laevisoma
 Somatidia flavidorsis Broun, 1917
 Somatidia halli Broun, 1914
 Somatidia laevior Broun, 1893
 Somatidia laevithorax Breuning, 1940
 Somatidia maculata Broun, 1921
 Somatidia metallica Breuning, 1982
 Somatidia pinguis Broun, 1913
 Somatidia rufescens Breuning, 1940
 Somatidia suffusa Broun, 1917

subgenus Microsoma
 Somatidia fauveli Breuning, 1961

subgenus Nodulosoma
 Somatidia angusta Broun, 1880
 Somatidia costifer Broun, 1893
 Somatidia laevinotata Broun, 1917
 Somatidia nodularia Broun, 1913
 Somatidia picticornis Broun, 1895
 Somatidia posticalis Broun, 1913
 Somatidia spectabilis Broun, 1917
 Somatidia testacea Broun, 1909
 Somatidia websteriana Broun, 1909

subgenus Papusoma
 Somatidia kaszabi Breuning, 1975

subgenus Ptinosoma
 Somatidia ampliata Breuning, 1940
 Somatidia convexa Broun, 1893
 Somatidia latula Broun, 1893
 Somatidia pennulata Broun, 1921
 Somatidia ptinoides (Bates, 1874)
 Somatidia ruficornis Broun, 1914
 Somatidia waitei Broun, 1911

subgenus Somatidia
 Somatidia antarctica (White, 1846)
 Somatidia grandis Broun, 1895
 Somatidia longipes Sharp, 1878
 Somatidia simplex Broun, 1893

subgenus Spinosoma
 Somatidia helmsi Sharp, 1882

subgenus Tenebrosoma
 Somatidia albicoma Broun, 1893
 Somatidia corticola Broun, 1913
 Somatidia crassipes Broun, 1883
 Somatidia diversa Broun, 1880
 Somatidia nitida Broun, 1880
 Somatidia parvula Broun, 1917
 Somatidia pictipes Broun, 1880
 Somatidia pulchella Olliff, 1889
 Somatidia tenebrica Broun, 1893
 Somatidia terrestris Broun, 1880
 Somatidia testudo Broun, 1904

subgenus Villososomatidia
 Somatidia australiae Carter, 1926
 Somatidia capillosa Olliff, 1889
 Somatidia olliffi Lea, 1929
 Somatidia pernitida McKeown, 1940
 Somatidia tricolor Lea, 1929
 Somatidia villosa Lea, 1929

References

External links

 
Parmenini